"Domino" is a song written by the band Genesis for their 1986 album Invisible Touch. The song was the sixth track on the album. The music was written by the band, while the lyrics were written by keyboardist Tony Banks. The song is divided into two parts, "In the Glow of the Night" and "The Last Domino".

The song, though not released as a single, charted at number 29 on the Mainstream Rock Charts.

The B-side of the "Tonight, Tonight, Tonight" single was the first half of this song, "In the Glow of the Night", while the B-side of "Invisible Touch" was the second part of the song, "The Last Domino".

During a clip titled "Tony talks about his inspiration" on the When in Rome 2007 DVD, Banks states that his inspiration for the song lyrics was the 1982 Lebanon War which was still being contested prior to the recording of Invisible Touch. He set the action in a hotel room in Beirut, minutes after bombs start to fall on the city.

Live performances
Before the song was performed, Phil Collins would talk to the audience about the Domino Principle and demonstrate it by stating that something that might happen to the people in one section, might affect the people in another section (with the lights lighting up that section of the audience) multiple times. From when "The Last Domino" (Part 2) begins to the line "...now see what you've gone and done!", something different happened on every tour.

On the Invisible Touch Tour, Phil would have a red/pink-ish light shining up at his face. On the We Can't Dance Tour, Phil is high up in front of the jumbotron appearing to be levitating in the air. He is on a platform that can move up and down. On the Turn It On Again Tour, Phil's face appears on the jumbotron and he sings that section of the song.

It was performed on the Invisible Touch, We Can't Dance, Calling All Stations (with Ray Wilson on vocals) and Turn It On Again tours.

A live version appears on their albums The Way We Walk, Volume Two: The Longs, and Live Over Europe 2007 (simply titled "Domino") as well as corresponding DVDs Genesis Live at Wembley Stadium, The Way We Walk - Live in Concert and When in Rome 2007.

Critical reception
In 2014, Stevie Chick of The Guardian chose "Domino" as one of the ten best Genesis songs and the highlight of the Invisible Touch album, describing it as "a fusion of everything Genesis had ever been and now become: an 11-minute multi-part epic played with the minimal attack of 'Abacab', the haunting 'In the Glow of the Night' giving way to the anthemic synth-rock bombast of 'The Last Domino'".

Personnel 
 Tony Banks – keyboards, synth bass on "The Last Domino"
 Phil Collins – vocals, drums, LinnDrum, Simmons drums
 Mike Rutherford – electric guitars, bass guitar on "In the Glow of the Night"

Chart performance

References

External links

 Genesis - Official Website
http://www.songfacts.com/detail.php?id=40392

Genesis (band) songs
1986 songs
Songs based on actual events
Songs written by Phil Collins
Songs written by Mike Rutherford
Songs written by Tony Banks (musician)
Song recordings produced by Hugh Padgham